Nakşidil Sultan (1761 – 22 August 1817; meaning "Embroidered on the Heart" in Persian) was a consort of Sultan Abdul Hamid I, and Valide Sultan to their son Mahmud II, Sultan of the Ottoman Empire.

Background

Origins
According to various scholars, she came from a family with origins in the Caucasus region. Fikret Saraçoğlu has found in the archives of the Topkapı Palace in Istanbul documents pertaining to her death and funeral. Others like Necdet Sakaoğlu and Ibrahim Pazan traced these origins further and claim she was actually a Georgian. She was raised in the Ottoman palace and was given thoroughly Turkish Islamic education.

Controversy over identity
There is a fanciful legend that she was Aimée du Buc de Rivéry, who had gone missing at sea in 1788, and was a distant cousin-in-law of the former Empress Josephine, wife of Napoleon Bonaparte. According to this myth, Aimée du Buc de Rivéry was captured by Barbary pirates and sold as a harem concubine, but modern historian have debunked this.

Several older myths, dating back even to the early 16th century, already purported connections between the French and the Ottoman monarchies. These have been found to be politically motivated fabrications, intended to justify alliances between the two (supposedly related) monarchies. The Aimée-Nakşidil tale shows several distinct parallels to these older tales. In times of monarchy, the stories about abducted French princesses weren't repudiated by French officials to maintain good relations with the Ottoman inventors of the tales. In later times this and similar harem tales have been used in France to perpetuate a view of Turkey, the Middle East and the Islam in general as mysterious and despotic in nature, despite more accurate accounts available.

However, fifty years later, in 1867, when Sultan Abdulaziz, son of Mahmud, went to Paris to be entertained by Napoleon III, he was greeted with great enthusiasm by Napoleon, who told the press that their grandmothers were related. Another invented tradition concerning a French woman with royal connections in the Ottoman harem was being created to support the political aspirations of the rulers of the Ottoman Empire and France. As in other examples of invented traditions, this legend was loosely connected with a historical phenomenon. Initially this legend also emphasized the relationship between the two rulers, just as the earlier myth had done.

As imperial consort
Nakşidil, who had been a lady-in-waiting to Esma Sultan, daughter of Sultan Ahmed III, married Abdul Hamid in 1782. She was given the title of "Seventh Consort". On 22 October 1783, she gave birth to her first child, a son, Şehzade Murad Seyfullah, who died at the age of one year of smallpox on 3 March 1784.
 
One year later, on 20 July 1785, she gave birth to her second child, a son, Şehzade Mahmud (future Sultan Mahmud II). One year later, on 28 November 1786, she gave birth to her third child, a daughter, Saliha Sultan, who died at the age one on 10 April 1788.

In 1788, Nakşidil commissioned a fountain in Sultanahmet next to the prison known as the "Nakşi Kadın Fountain". She was widowed at Abdul Hamid's death in 1789.

Widowhood and Valide Sultan
In 1807, after the accession of her stepson, Sultan Mustafa IV, her daily and weekly allocations were raised. During these years, the monthly and annual income sources of Nakşidil came from the three farms located in Taşçı Han, near the Fatih Mosque.

In 1808, assassins sent by his half-brother Mustafa, aided by the Ulema, sought to murder Mahmud. Nakşidil saved her son by concealing him, so that he lived to become the next sultan,
Mahmud II. Mahmud became sultan after having ordered the death of his half-brother, Mustafa, who had previously ordered the deaths of Mahmud II, and of their cousin, Selim III, whom he had deposed as sultan, and Nakşidil became the Valide Sultan.

In 1809, she commissioned a fountain near Sarıkadı Village in Üsküdar known as "Nakşidil Sultan fountain". In 1817, she established another fountain, kitchen, and her own mausoleum in Fatih.

Death and aftermath
In 1816, Nakşidil was struck by a severe illness. Two Greek doctors treated her but were unable to heal her. The chief physician advised Nakşidil to have some rest at the mansion of Gümrükçü Osman Ağa at Çamlıca, but the weather there affected her health, and so she returned to Beşiktaş Palace, where she died on 22 August 1817 of tuberculosis. She was buried in her own mausoleum located at Fatih, Istanbul.

The wife of a French ambassador was present in Istanbul at the time of Nakşidil's death. 
She writes:

In 1818, her son Sultan Mahmud commissioned a fountain (sebil) known as "Nakşidil Sultan Sebil" in the memory of his mother. Her son, and her grandson Abdulmejid I also died of tuberculosis in 1839 and 1861 respectively.

Issue
Together with Abdul Hamid, Nakşidil had three children, two sons and a daughter:
 Şehzade Seyfullah Murad (Topkapı Palace, 22 October 1783 – Topkapı Palace, 21 January 1785);
 Mahmud II (Topkapı Palace, 20 July 1785 - Istanbul, Turkey, 1 July 1839, buried in Mahmud II Mausoleum), 30th Sultan of the Ottoman Empire;
 Saliha Sultan (Topkapı Palace, 27 November 1786 – Topkapı Palace, 10 April 1788);

Gallery

See also
Ottoman dynasty
Ottoman family tree
List of Valide Sultans
List of consorts of the Ottoman Sultans
Aimée du Buc de Rivéry

References

Sources

External links
The Veiled Empress' tomb

1761 births
1817 deaths
Valide sultan
Georgians from the Ottoman Empire
18th-century consorts of Ottoman sultans
19th-century consorts of Ottoman sultans
Mahmud II